Polynoncus erugatus is a species of hide beetle in the subfamily Omorginae found in Argentina.

References

erugatus
Beetles described in 1990